Mariano Uña Ramos (27 May 1933 – 23 May 2014) was an Argentinian musician.

Uña Ramos was born in Humahuaca, Argentina, near the border with Bolivia. He was a renowned Andean musician and composer, a virtuoso of the quena, the end blown bamboo flute of the Andean Altiplano. He died in 2014 in Paris, four days before his 81st birthday.

Discography
 El Arte de la Quena Vol. 1 (1971)
 El Arte de la Quena Vol. 2 (1971)
 Quena (1972)
 Quena de los Andes (1975)
 Un roseau plein de musique (1976)
 Hermanos al Sol (1976)
 Haru No Umi (1977)
 Initiation à la kena (1978)
 Poupée de porcelaine (1978)
 Le Pont de bois (1979)
 La Vallée des coquelicots (1982)
 Uña Ramos y sus amigos: Canciones y danzas de música Argentina (1985)
 La Princesse de la mer (1986)
 Una flauta en la noche Vol. 1 (1994) (Arton records)
 Una flauta en la noche Vol. 2 (1995) (Arton records)
 Le Souffle du roseau (1996)
 Live in France 2004 (2004)
 Uña Ramos en la Filarmonica de Berlin (2007)

Collaborations
 Urubamba (1974) with Urubamba
 Symphonie Celtique (1980) by Alan Stivell
 La pianta del tè (1988) by Ivano Fossati

DVD
 2008 - En Vivo en Kehl Alemania 1994 / Live in Kehl Germany 1994

References

1933 births
People from Jujuy Province
Argentine musicians
Andean music
2014 deaths